The 2016 FC Aktobe season is the 16th successive season that the club will play in the Kazakhstan Premier League, the highest tier of association football in Kazakhstan. Aktobe will also play in the Kazakhstan Cup and the Europa League.

Prior to the season starting, Aktobe appointed Yuri Utkulbayev as their new manager following the end of Ioan Andone's contract.

Squad

Transfers

Winter

In:

Out:

 

Trialists:

Summer

In:

 

 

Out:

Friendlies

Competitions

Kazakhstan Premier League

Regular season

Results summary

Results by round

Results

League table

Championship round

Results summary

Results by round

Results

League table

Kazakhstan Cup

UEFA Europa League

Qualifying rounds

Squad statistics

Appearances and goals

|-
|colspan="14"|Players away from Aktobe on loan:
|-
|colspan="14"|Players who appeared for Aktobe that left during the season:

|}

Goal scorers

Disciplinary record

Notes

References

External links
Official VK

FC Aktobe seasons
Aktobe